The Central Range montane rain forests is a tropical moist forest ecoregion on the island of New Guinea. The ecoregion covers the Central Range of the New Guinea Highlands, which extends along the spine of the island. The montane rain forests of the ecoregion are distinct from the surrounding lowland forests, and are home to many endemic plants and animals.

Geography
The ecoregion includes the montane rain forests of the Central Range, or Central Cordillera, between 1000 and 3000 metres elevation. The Central Range extends east and west across New Guinea, with the western portion of the range in Indonesia and the eastern portion in Papua New Guinea. The Central Range includes the Snow Mountains in Indonesia's Papua Province, the Star Mountains which span the Indonesia–Papua New Guinea border, and the Central and Eastern Highlands of Papua New Guinea.

Below 1000 metres, the montane forests transition to separate lowland forest ecoregions. The tree line is at approximately 3000 metres elevation, above which are the high-elevation Central Range sub-alpine grasslands.

Flora
There are three broad vegetation zones in the Central Range – lower montane forest, upper montane forest, and high mountain forest.

Lower montane forest extends from the lowland forest transition at approximately 1000 metres, up to 2,500 metres. Lower montane forest zone is characterized by trees in the beech family (Fagaceae) including Castanopsis acuminatissima and species of Lithocarpus, elaeocarps (Elaeocarpaceae), and laurels (Lauraceae). The conifer Araucaria can form thick stands in some lower areas.

Upper montane forest occurs above 1500 m and is characterized by various evergreen species of southern beech (Nothofagus), either in mixed stands with trees of other species or in pure stands, particularly on ridge crests and upper slopes. Mosses and other epiphytes cover the trees. The Central Range has the greatest diversity of species from Nothfagus subgenus Brassospora.

High mountain forest begins at approximately 2500 metres elevation, and extends to the tree line, in places extending to 3,900 m in the higher-elevation subalpine grasslands ecoregion. Characteristic trees are  conifers – species of Podocarpus, Dacrycarpus, Dacridium, Papuacedrus, Araucaria, and Libocedrus – along with broadleaf trees in the myrtle family (Myrtaceae). High mountain forest generally has a thin canopy, lower than the upper montane forests, and thick understory.

Fauna
The ecoregion is home to 90 species of mammals, including marsupials, murid rodents, and bats. 44 species are endemic or near-endemic species whose ranges extend into neighboring ecoregions.

A range of Australasian tropical marsupials are native to the ecoregion, including tree kangaroos. Endemic marsupials include the speckled dasyure (Neophascogale lorentzii), great-tailed triok (Dactylopsila megalura), Stein's cuscus (Phalanger vestitus), Telefomin cuscus (Phalanger matanim), Weyland ringtail possum (Pseudocheirus caroli), and Pygmy ringtail possum (Pseudocheirus mayeri). Near-endemic marsupial species include the red-bellied marsupial shrew (Phascolosorex doriae) black-tailed dasyure (Murexia melanurus), Macleay's dorcopsis (Dorcopsulus macleayi), mouse bandicoot (Microperoryctes murina), and Clara's echymipera (Echymipera clara).
 
Three bat species –  the Telefomin roundleaf bat (Hipposideros corynophyllus), New Guinea sheath-tailed bat (Emballonura furax), and small-toothed long-eared bat (Nyctophilus microdon) – are endemic. Near-endemic bat species include the Fly River roundleaf bat (Hipposideros muscinus), Greater Papuan pipistrelle (Pipistrellus collinus), Fly River trumpet-eared bat (Kerivoula muscina), Mantled mastiff bat (Otomops secundus), moss-forest blossom bat (Syconycteris hobbit), and Bulmer's fruit bat (Aproteles bulmerae). Bulmer's fruit bat is critically endangered.

Endemic murid rodents include Paraleptomys wilhelmina, Hydromys habbema, lesser small-toothed rat (Macruromys elegans), Melomys fellowsi, Melomys lanosus, Coccymys albidens, Rattus giluwensis, and Pogonomys championi. Near-endemic and limited-range native murids include the large leptomys (Leptomys elegans), mottled-tailed shrew mouse (Pseudohydromys fuscus), eastern shrew mouse (Pseudohydromys murinus), Mayermys ellermani, Hydromys hussoni, Crossomys moncktoni, Xenuromys barbatus, Melomys lorentzii, Pogonomelomys mayeri, Pogonomelomys bruijni, Abeomelomys sevia, Rattus novaeguineae, Hyomys dammermani, Hydromys shawmayeri, Ernst Mayr's water rat (Leptomys ernstmayri), and Melomys gracilis. Three murids - the large leptomys, eastern shrew mouse, and lesser small-toothed rat – are critically endangered.

348 bird species live in the ecoregion. 55 bird species are endemic or near endemic. Endemic bird species include the Papuan whipbird (Androphobus viridis), sooty shrike-thrush (Colluricincla umbrina), Snow Mountain munia (Lonchura montana), black-breasted munia (Lonchura teerinki), Archbold's bowerbird (Archboldia papuensis), short-tailed paradigalla (Paradigalla brevicauda), and  King-of-Saxony bird-of-paradise (Pteridophora alberti). The ecoregion, together with the Central Range sub-alpine grasslands, constitutes the Central Papuan Mountains endemic bird area. Some of the near-endemic birds also range into the sub-alpine grasslands, and/or into other New Guinea mountain ranges.

Butterfly centres of endemism in the ecoregion include the Weyland Range, with nine endemic species, and the Hagen-Sepik-Wahgi Divide, with five endemic species.

Protected areas 
14.3% of the ecoregion is in protected areas.

References 

Australasian ecoregions
Ecoregions of Indonesia
Ecoregions of New Guinea
Ecoregions of Papua New Guinea

Montane forests
Natural history of Western New Guinea
Tropical and subtropical moist broadleaf forests